Evergreens is a compilation album by Italian singer Mina, issued in 1974 and distributed only on audio cassette.

All the songs were previously published on other albums, except for "Lamento d'amore", released in 1973 on a 45rpm.

Track listing

1974 compilation albums
Mina (Italian singer) compilation albums
Italian-language compilation albums